Citak or Kaunak is the Papuan language of Citak-Mitak subdistrict (Kecamatan), Mappi Regency, Indonesia. It is called by its speaker Kau Adagum (Kau Language), Citak is an exonym from the tribe Auyu. Tamnim Citak is a distinct dialect. Diuwe is unverified as a language.

References 

Asmat-Kamoro languages
Languages of western New Guinea